Badia Polesine is a comune (municipality) in the Province of Rovigo in the Italian region Veneto, located about  southwest of Venice and about  west of Rovigo. It is part of the upper Polesine, and is bounded by the Adige river, which separates the communal territory from the province of Padua.

Badia Polesine borders the following municipalities: Canda, Castagnaro, Castelbaldo, Giacciano con Baruchella, Lendinara, Masi, Piacenza d'Adige, Terrazzo, Trecenta. The main sight is the abbey of Vangadizza.

The town has a station on the Verona-Legnago-Rovigo railroad. It can be reached by road through the  SS343 Transpolesana national road and the A31 motorway.

Twin towns
Badia Polesine is twinned with:

  Estepa, Spain
  Saint-Thibault-des-Vignes, France

References

External links
 Official website

Cities and towns in Veneto